Alıbəyli (also, Alybeili and Alybeyli) is a village and municipality in the Aghdam District of Azerbaijan. It has a population of 3,366. The municipality consists of the villages of Kiçikli, Birinci Alıbəyli, and İkinci Alıbəyli.

References 

Populated places in Aghdam District